Scaevola pulchella is a species of flowering plant in the family Goodeniaceae. It is a small, spreading shrub with blue to mauve flowers borne on terminal spikes and is endemic to Western Australia.

Description
The stems are slender, more or less ridged and covered with silvery, long, spreading, soft hairs.

Taxonomy naming
Scaevola pulchella was first formally described in 1990 by Roger Charles Carolin and the description was published in Telopea. The specific epithet (pulchella) means "beautiful and small".

Distribution and habitat
This scaevola grows on the spinifex plains near Carnarvon and east of Exmouth Gulf.

References

 

pulchella
Flora of Western Australia